Sreemangal is an upazila of Moulvibazar District in the Sylhet Division of Bangladesh. It is located at the southwest of the district, and borders the Habiganj District to the west and the Indian state of Tripura to the south. Sreemangal is often referred to as the 'tea capital' of Bangladesh, and is most famous for its tea fields. Other than tea, the rubber, pineapple, wood, betel, and lemon industries also exist in the upazila.

History
It is said the name Sreemangal (or Srimangal) is named after Sri Das and Mangal Das; two brothers who settled on the banks of the Hail Haor. A copper plate of Raja Marundanath from the 11th century was found in Kalapur. During an excavation at Lamua, an ancient statue of Ananta Narayan was dug out. In 1454, the Nirmai Shiva Bari was built and still stands today. Srimangal thana was established in 1912. The central town later became a pourashava in 1935. In 1963, two peasants were killed by police officers which kicked off the Balishira peasant riots. During the Bangladesh Liberation War of 1971, the Pakistani army reached Sreemangal on 30 April setting houses on fire and committing atrocities against women. The East Pakistan Rifles camp and Wapda office premises were among the two mass killing sites. Two mass graves remain in Bharaura with a memorial in North Bharaura.

Geography
It has 43,952 households and total area 450.74 km2. It is bordered by Moulvibazar Sadar to the north, Tripura to the south, Kamalganj to the east and Chunarughat, Nabiganj and Bahubal to the west.

Climate

Demographics
As of the 1991 Bangladesh census, Sreemangal has a population of 230,889. Males constitute 51.76% of the total population, and females 48.24%. This Upazila's 18+ population is 124,778. Sreemangal has an average literacy rate of 29.8% (7+ years), and the national average of 32.4% literate. About 57% of this sub district's people are Muslims while 40% are Hindus and others are Christians and Buddhist.

Economy and tourism
Madhobpur Lake is one of the main tourist attractions in the area, and is home to the Great White-Bellied Heron, the only confirmed site in Bangladesh. The Baikka beel is also a nearby body of water and home to the Large-billed reed warbler. Sreemangal has been nicknamed the tea capital of Bangladesh, due to the number of tea gardens in the area, and is the place of origin of the Seven Color Tea. The Bangladesh Tea Research Institute in Sreemangal has made a number of contributions in evolving and standardising the quality of tea, and introducing its research findings to the tea industry of Bangladesh. Pineapples from the Sreemangal area are known for their flavour and natural sweetness. In 2010, the Hum Hum waterfall was discovered and has attracted visitors from all over Bangladesh to Razkandi forest.

Administration
Sreemangal Upazila is divided into Sreemangal Municipality and nine union parishads: Ashidron, Bhunabir, Kalapur, Kalighat, Mirzapur, Rajghat, Satgaon, Sindurkhan, and Sreemangal. The union parishads are subdivided into 108 mauzas and 208 villages.

Sreemangal Municipality is subdivided into 9 wards and 20 mahallas.

Education

According to Banglapedia, Victoria High School, founded in 1924, is a notable secondary school. The Jamia Luthfia Anwarul Uloom Hamidnagar is a notable madrasa and Islamic centre in the Sylhet region.

Notable people
Om family

See also
Magurchara Punji
Shaharsree
Baraoora Tea Estate
Bhurbhuria Tea Estate

References

Srimangal Upazila